Dobrzany is a town in Stargard County, West Pomeranian Voivodeship, north-west Poland.

Dobrzany  may also refer to:

 Gmina Dobrzany, an administrative district in Stargard County, West Pomeranian Voivodeship, north-west Poland
 Dobrzany, Lower Silesian Voivodeship (south-west Poland)

See also
Dobriany, Stryi Raion, Lviv Oblast, Ukraine